William Landry Aronson (born 1981, New Haven, Connecticut) is an American composer and writer for musical theater, whose work includes the scores for Pete the Cat, Mother, Me & the Monsters, and My Scary Girl. He also composed and co-wrote the book for the late 21st-century romance Maybe Happy Ending (2017), The Trouble with The Dog, and Bungee Jump, cited by the NY Times in 2013 as Korea’s “most popular original musical,” and winner of Best Score at the Korean Musical Awards. Current projects include Hansel & Gretl & Heidi & Günter and Wind-Up Girl.

Aronson is the recipient of the Richard Rodgers Award, a Fulbright grant, the ASCAP Frederick Loewe Award, an EST/Sloan grant, and three Korean Musical Awards. In addition to his theatrical work, Aronson has composed and produced over 200 tracks for the ESL children's book/DVD series, English Egg.

Education
Aronson holds a B.A. in music from Harvard University. As an undergraduate, Aronson was the composer of Hasty Pudding Theatricals' 154th production, Snow Place Like Home, and co-author/lyricist of its 155th production, It's a Wonderful Afterlife.

After graduation from Harvard, Aronson studied Music Theory as a Fulbright Scholar at Universität der Künste in Berlin.

Aronson holds an M.F.A. from the Graduate Musical Theatre Writing Program of the Tisch School of the Arts at New York University. While studying at NYU, he received the ASCAP Frederick Loewe Scholarship and a 2006 Baryshnikov Fellowship. In 2007 he was named by the Dramatists Guild of America as one of "50 to Watch".

Work
Aronson wrote the score for a musical version of the Korean movie My Scary Girl (book and lyrics by Kyoung-ae Kang), which ran in Seoul, South Korea. The show won Best Original Musical (small theater category) at the 2009 Korea Musical Awards. An English-language version of the show, with book co-written by Mark St. Germain and additional lyrics by William Finn, ran at Barrington Stage Company's Stage II, July 10–26, 2008. The New York Musical Theater Festival (NYMF) presented the Korean version of My Scary Girl October 1–4, 2009. My Scary Girl was named the Outstanding New Musical at NYMF for 2009.

 
A reading of Aronson's musical The Trouble with Doug, co-written with Daniel Maté, was directed by Victoria Clark at the NAMT theater festival in 2010.

With William Finn as lyricist, Aronson has composed songs for Sybille Pearson’s play Next, Mary Testa’s Sleepless Variations, and Finn’s own Songs of Innocence and Experience. Aronson was the musical arranger for the Finn-Lapine musical Little Miss Sunshine performed at La Jolla Playhouse in 2011.

In 2011 Aronson composed the score for Mormons, Mothers and Monsters (book and lyrics by Sam Salmond), which ran at Barrington Stage Company's Stage II.

In 2012,  Aronson wrote the score for the Korean musical Bungee Jump (lyrics by Hue Park), based on the 2001 film Bungee Jumping of Their Own. The production was successful and won the award for best score at the 7th Musical Awards and the 18th Korea Musical Awards.

Park and Aronson had a try-out production of their new musical, Maybe Happy Ending, at Wooran Foundation in September 2015. The musical was premiered by DaeMyoung Culture Factory in December 2016. Directed by Kim Dong-yeon, The show won six Korean Musical Awards, including Best Director, Best Music, Lyrics and Book. The English-language version of "Maybe Happy Ending" was awarded the 2017 Richard Rodgers Award by the American Academy of Arts and Letters. A new Korean production opened in 2018. In 2020, Maybe Happy Ending will have its American premier at the Alliance Theatre in Atlanta from Jan. 18 to Feb. 16.

References

1981 births
Tisch School of the Arts alumni
American musical theatre composers
Living people
Berlin University of the Arts alumni
Hasty Pudding alumni